David Joseph Phillips (born April 19, 1978) is a Canadian actor and producer best known for starring in numerous theatrical performances in Toronto and at the Stratford Festival, hosting Video & Arcade Top 10 and The Miss Canada Pageant. He is also known for acting in the films Poker Night, Shark City, Green Guys and Re-Generator, and then producing and acting in Life Happens , Moments of Clarity, Amateur Night, Mission Park, The Maestro and Eat Wheaties!.

Early life and education
Phillips was born in Brampton, Ontario, to Margaret and James Phillips. He was raised in Brampton, Ontario, attending high school at St. Thomas Aquinas Secondary School (Brampton).  He was then admitted with a scholarship into Ryerson Theatre School in Toronto, where he received his BFA, and played the lead in his graduate production of Henry IV directed by John Neville.

Career
After graduating he took a brief hiatus from performing and was a ninth grade math and geography teacher at his old high school in Brampton.  He went back to entertainment in 2000, when he co-hosted the Canadian kids game show Video & Arcade Top 10 for two years.  He was then part of the classical acting company at The Stratford Festival of Canada for the next three years, where he appeared in eight productions, and received a Tyrone Guthrie award for his efforts.  He then returned to the Greater Toronto Area, where he performed in many classical theatre productions, including playing Estragon in the well-received Waiting For Godot, as well as the Canadian Premiere of Mephisto

Continuation into movies
David appeared in the independent feature films Winter and Poker Night in Toronto.  Upon moving to Los Angeles in 2008 he was immediately cast to play the lead role in Shark City  with Vivica A. Fox and Corey Haim.  Since then he has booked steady work in Hollywood films.  In 2010, he acted as a lead role in both the films Ecstasy and Green Guys (opposite fellow Bramptonian Kris Lemche), appeared opposite Lisa Nova in the YouTube video Fantasy Pool Date.  Though he lives in Los Angeles, he still returns to Toronto to work often, and hosted the 2008 Miss World Canada Pageant.

In 2010, he helped produce three films with Stardust Pictures which he also acted in - Boy Toy, A Holiday Heist, and Life Happens with Krysten Ritter, Kate Bosworth, and Rachel Bilson.

Recent and Future Work
In 2013 David produced a Latino crime-thriller called "Mission Park" that was awarded Best Film honors at international film festivals in Boston, Miami, East L.A., Houston, and Las Vegas. It features Sean Patrick Flanery, Vivica A. Fox, Will Estes, Joseph Julian Soria, and Will Rothhaar and he helped secure the theatrical release September 2013 through AMC Theatres.
In 2013 David created his own production company called 'Phillm Productions' which has produced four feature films: Moments of Clarity starring Lyndsy Fonseca, Eric Roberts and Mackenzie Astin, Badsville starring Emilio Rivera and Robert Knepper,  The Maestro starring Xander Berkeley and Jon Polito, and Eat Wheaties! starring Tony Hale, Elisha Cuthbert, and Paul Walter Hauser.

Filmography

Feature films 
 Winter (2007)
 Poker Night (2008)
 Three Shades of Black (2009)
 Shark City (2009)
 Ecstasy (2010)
 Green Guys (2010)
 Boy Toy (2011)
 One Night (2011)
 Life Happens (2011)
 A Holiday Heist (2011)
 Re-generator (2013)
 Mission Park (2013)
 Moments of Clarity (2015)
 Amateur Night (2016)
 Badsville (2017)
 The Maestro (2018)
 Eat Wheaties! (2020)

TV 
 Video & Arcade Top 10 (2000-2001) TV series - co-host
 A Beaver Tale (2005) TV pilot - lead
 Miss Canada Globe Pageant (2005-2009) - host
 Johnny (2007) TV pilot - lead
 Miss World Canada (2008)  - host

Theatre 
 "The Mousetrap"  (2000)  - Toronto Truck Theatre
 "Mephisto" - Canadian Premiere (2001) - Harbourfront Centre, Toronto
 Stratford Festival of Canada Company Member (2002–2005):
 All's Well That Ends Well
 The Scarlet Pimpernel
 The White Devil
 A Midsummer Night's Dream
 The Birds
 Quiet In The Land
 Macbeth
 Henry VIII
 "Waiting For Godot" (2004) - Heritage Theatre
 "Rosencrantz and Guildenstern Are Dead" (2005)  - Heritage Theatre
 "Twelfth Night" (2006) - Heritage Theatre
 "Much Ado About Nothing" (2006) - Rose Theatre
 "The Complete Works of William Shakespeare (Abridged)" (2007) - Rose Theatre
 "Dancing at Lughnasa" (2007) - The Annex, Toronto Theatre

Awards and honors
1997 Ryerson Entrance Scholarship
2003 Stratford Tyrone Guthrie Award

References

External links 

  Shark City interview
  CityTV Interview
 Stratford Conservatory Alumni 2002/2003
 https://www.variety.com/index.asp?layout=chart_film_prod_d&dept=Film&recordid=1117786330/ Winter Movie Listing
http://www.28dayslateranalysis.com/2010/06/greedy-green-guys-fall-hard-in-this.html
 http://www.monstersandcritics.com/movies/news/article_1593194.php/Actors-hook-up-with-Baby
 http://www.latinheat.com/film/q-a-with-the-guys-of-mission-park/
 http://www.latinheat.com/film/armando-montelongo-reality-tv-star-flips-for-mission-park/
 https://www.ramascreen.com/watch-xander-berkeley-and-sarah-clarke-in-this-trailer-for-the-maestro/
 https://www.ciffcalgary.ca/films/2020/eat-wheaties%21/

1978 births
Canadian male film actors
Living people
People from Brampton
Male actors from Ontario

de:David Phillips
es:David Phillips
fr:David Phillips
nl:David Phillips
pt:David Phillips